In Washington, D.C., LGBT culture is heavily influenced by the U.S. federal government and the many nonprofit organizations headquartered in the city.

Demographics 

From 2015 to 2016, Gallup polling reported that 8.6% of District of Columbia residents identified as lesbian, gay, bisexual, or transgender (LGBT), a higher percentage than any U.S. state.

There are an estimated 209,000 LGBT people living in the broader Washington metropolitan area, making up 4.5% of the population. The Census Bureau reported that there were 6,935 same-sex households in Washington, D.C., in 2018, of which 61% were same-sex spouses. In 2017, 2.9% of all households were same-sex couple households. 77.4% of these households were male couples.

History

1950s and 1960s 
Starting in 1950, in parallel to McCarthyism, the "Lavender Scare" resulted in the firing of thousands of government employees and contractors who were believed to be gay or lesbian, on the grounds of a tenuous perceived connection between homosexuality and espionage. Washington, D.C. vice squad lieutenant Roy Blick asserted to the Senate without evidence that there were 5,000 homosexual government employees. In 1961, following the Lavender Scare, Frank Kameny and Jack Nichols founded the Washington chapter of the Mattachine Society, adapting tactics learned from the civil rights movement and organizing pickets at the White House, Pentagon, and State Department.

1970s and 1980s 
In 1970, activists from the civil rights movement, antiwar movement, and Black Panthers created the Gay Liberation Front-DC. The group staged public demonstrations and helped organize Washington's first gay pride in May 1972. The festival took place in Lafayette Park and at George Washington University and featured a dance, a drag show, and a religious celebration.

In 1971, Kameny ran unsuccessfully in the 1971 District of Columbia's at-large congressional district special election.

The Furies Collective, a lesbian feminist collective whose members included Rita Mae Brown and Joan E. Biren, pressured the National Organization for Women to accept lesbians in the early 1970s.

A former member of the Gay Liberation Front-DC, Deacon Maccubbin, opened Lambda Rising in 1974. The now-defunct bookstore was one of the United States' largest gay bookstores and provided a space for other community groups. Maccubbin organized the first official DC gay pride in 1975.

In 1979, students at Howard University created the Lambda Student Alliance, the first organization for LGBT students created at a historically black college or university. In October the same year, the National Third World Lesbian and Gay Conference took place at an unknown hotel near the university, coinciding with the first National March on Washington for Lesbian and Gay Rights.

In 1982, James Tinney created Faith Temple to cater to LGBT Christians.

The Second National March on Washington for Lesbian and Gay Rights was a large political rally that took place in Washington, D.C., on October 11, 1987.

The AIDS Memorial Quilt, originally created by Cleve Jones in response to the assassination of Harvey Milk was displayed on the National Mall in 1987.

1990s and 2000s 
The March on Washington for Lesbian, Gay and Bi Equal Rights and Liberation in 1993 generated widespread attention and included a performance by Melissa Etheridge. The 1993 march was organized by Urvashi Vaid, the president of the National Gay and Lesbian Task Force. According to Joan E. Biren, this was the first time Jumbotrons were set up on the National Mall aside from government-organized events.

The Millennium March on Washington was an event to raise awareness and visibility of lesbian, gay, bisexual and transgender (LGBT) people and issues of LGBT rights in the US, it was held April 28 through April 30, 2000.

The National Equality March was a national political rally that occurred October 11, 2009 in Washington, D.C.

2010s and 2020s 
In 2015, following the U.S. Supreme Court rulings that states must recognize same-sex marriages, the White House was lit in with the colors of the Pride flag.

In 2017, protesters with No Justice No Pride blocked the Capital Pride Parade near 15th Street NW and P Street NW. The group opposed Capital Pride's corporate sponsorship and cooperation with police, and accused the event of marginalizing minorities. The parade was re-routed onto 16th Street NW and towards Rhode Island Avenue, while Police allowed the group to continue protesting with no arrests.

The National Pride March took place on June 11, 2017 alongside Capital Pride. Marchers walked past the White House towards the U.S. Capitol.

Neighborhoods

Dupont Circle 

The Dupont Circle neighborhood is a historical hub of LGBT life in Washington D.C. The area hosts several LGBT events, including the 17th Street High Heel Race and the Capital Pride Parade. The neighborhood also has several gay bars, including JR's. A stretch of 17th Street NW is named in honor of Frank Kameny. Before closing in 2010, the Lambda Rising bookstore was located on Connecticut Avenue NW.

The Gay Way 
The neighborhood around 8th Street Southeast was the location of many LGBT establishments from the 1960s through the 1980s and became known as "The Gay Way." Following riots in 1968, 8th Street became a hub for LGBT culture, including lesbian bars Phase 1, Jo-Anna's, and Club Madame. As the area gentrified in the 2000s, many LGBT establishments closed.

Organizations and community institutions 

Many LGBT nonprofit organizations have headquarters in Washington, D.C., including:

 Human Rights Campaign
 LGBTQ Victory Fund
 National Center for Transgender Equality
 National LGBTQ Task Force
 National LGBT Chamber of Commerce
 PFLAG

Additionally, a number of local organizations provide services to the LGBT community in the Washington metropolitan area, including:

 Casa Ruby
 The DC Center for the LGBT Community
 Supporting and Mentoring Youth Advocates and Leaders (SMYAL)
 Us Helping Us
 Whitman-Walker Health

Media 

The Washington Blade is the oldest LGBT newspaper in the United States, with its first issue published in 1969 and its first newsprint edition published in 1974. The American radical feminist periodical off our backs was first published in 1970, and ran until 2008. Blacklight, a periodical for black lesbians and gay men was first published in 1979. Metro Weekly has been published since 1994.

Recreation

Nightclubs, bars and other businesses 
Many gay bars are located throughout Washington, D.C., with notable locations including JR's, Number 9, Nellie's Sports Bar, and The Fireplace.

Defunct 

Nob Hill opened in 1957, and was one of the first African-American gay bars in the United States.

Located in a former Tropical Oil Company warehouse within the industrial neighborhood of Buzzard Point, Pier 9 was a gay disco open from 1970 through the early 1980s. In 2001, another gay club, Ziegfeld's/Secrets, opened in the building. Ziegfeld's/Secrets had opened in 1980 in another location on O Street S.E. but was forced to move due to the construction of Nationals Park. The club closed in March 2020, during the COVID-19 pandemic, and the building was demolished as part of the redevelopment of Buzzard Point.

Operating from 1971 to January 2016, Phase 1 had been the longest continuously running lesbian bar in the country. The bar's second location, Phase 1 Dupont, was open from 2012 to 2014.

The LGBT bookstore Lambda Rising operated from 1974 to 2010.

Ray Melrose opened the Enik Alley Coffeehouse in 1982. The coffeehouse served as a meeting space for LGBT people of color, particularly black lesbians.

Delta Elite Social Club in the Brookland neighborhood catered to black LGBTQ people until it closed in 2014.

Lace on the Avenue, a nightclub for LBTQ women of color  was open from 2008 to 2014.

Events 

The first Capital Pride Parade was held in 1975, following a small event festival in May 1972.

The 17th Street High Heel Race, drag queen sprint, takes place annually in Dupont Circle on the Tuesday before Halloween.

D.C. Black Pride includes a week of events, and was noted as the first Black Pride event in the U.S.

Notable people 

 Ruby Corado, trans activist
 Kelela, singer and songwriter
 J. August Richards, actor
 André Leon Talley, fashion journalist and former editor-at-large of Vogue magazine
 Tatianna, drag queen
 Michael W. Twitty, writer and culinary historian
 Samira Wiley, actress

See also 
 LGBT rights in the District of Columbia
 LGBT culture in Baltimore

References

Further reading 
  Includes coverage of the lavender scare.